Vonda Neel McIntyre was an American science fiction writer and biologist. This bibliography includes all of her published novels, short fiction, edited volumes, and all collections that include material not previously published.

Books

Short fiction

References

McIntyre, Vonda
 
McIntyre, Vonda
McIntyre, Vonda